Lieutenant-General Bernard Cyril Freyberg, 1st Baron Freyberg,  (21 March 1889 – 4 July 1963) was a British-born New Zealand soldier and Victoria Cross recipient, who served as the 7th Governor-General of New Zealand from 1946 to 1952.

Freyberg served as an officer in the British Army during the First World War. He took part in the beach landings during the Gallipoli Campaign and was the youngest general in the British Army during the First World War, later serving on the Western Front, where he was decorated with the Victoria Cross and three Distinguished Service Orders, making him one of the most highly decorated British Empire soldiers of the First World War. He liked to be in the thick of the action: Winston Churchill called him "the Salamander" due to his ability to pass through fire unharmed.

During the Second World War, he commanded the New Zealand Expeditionary Force in the Battle of Crete, the North African Campaign and the Italian Campaign. Freyberg was involved in the Allied defeat in the Battle of Greece, defeated again as the Allied commander in the Battle of Crete and performed successfully in the North African Campaign commanding the 2nd New Zealand Division, including during the Second Battle of El Alamein.

In Italy, he was defeated again at the Second Battle of Cassino as a corps commander but later relieved Padua and Venice and was one of the first to enter Trieste, where he confronted Josip Broz Tito's Yugoslav Partisans. By the end of the Second World War, Freyberg had spent ten and a half years fighting the Germans.

Early life

Freyberg, born in Richmond, Surrey, to James Freyberg and his second wife, Julia (née Hamilton) was of partial Austrian-German descent. He moved to New Zealand with his parents at the age of two. He attended Wellington College from 1897 to 1904. A strong swimmer, he won the New Zealand 100-yards championship in 1906 and 1910.

On 22 May 1911, Freyberg gained formal registration as a dentist. He worked as an assistant dentist in Morrinsville and later practised in Hamilton and in Levin. While in Morrinsville he was asked to take up a subalternship in the local Territorial Army unit, but he did not succeed in gaining the King's commission.

Freyberg left New Zealand in March 1914. A 1942 Life magazine article claims that Freyberg went to San Francisco and Mexico around this time, and was a captain under Pancho Villa during the Mexican Revolution. Upon hearing of the outbreak of war in Europe in August 1914, he travelled to Britain via Los Angeles (where he won a swimming competition) and New York (where he won a prizefight), to earn money to cross the United States and the Atlantic.

First World War
Immediately on the outbreak of the First World War Freyberg went to England and volunteered for service. G. S. Richardson arranged for him to join the 7th "Hood" Battalion of the Royal Naval Brigade, and he was on the Belgian front in September 1914. In late 1914 Freyberg met Winston Churchill, then First Lord of the Admiralty, and persuaded him to grant him a Royal Naval Volunteer Reserve commission in the 'Hood' Battalion, part of the 2nd (Royal Naval) Brigade of the newly constituted Royal Naval Division.

In April 1915 Freyberg became involved in the Dardanelles campaign. On the night of 24 April, during the initial landings by Allied troops following the failed naval attempt to force the straits by sea, Freyberg volunteered to swim ashore in the Gulf of Saros. Once ashore, he began lighting flares so as to distract the defending Turkish forces from the real landings taking place at Gallipoli. Despite coming under heavy Turkish fire, he returned safely from this outing and received the Distinguished Service Order (DSO). He received serious wounds on several occasions and left the peninsula when his division evacuated in January 1916.

Victoria Cross
In May 1916 Freyberg was transferred to the British Army as a captain in the Queen's (Royal West Surrey) Regiment. However, he remained with the 'Hood' Battalion as a seconded temporary major and went with them to France. During the final stages of the Battle of the Somme, when commanding a battalion as a temporary lieutenant-colonel, he so distinguished himself in the capture of Beaucourt village that he was awarded the Victoria Cross. On 13 November 1916 at Beaucourt-sur-Ancre, France, after Freyberg's battalion had carried the initial attack through the enemy's front system of trenches, he rallied and re-formed his own much disorganised men and some others, and led them on a successful assault of the second objective, during which he suffered two wounds, but remained in command and held his ground throughout the day and the following night. When reinforced the next morning, he attacked and captured a strongly fortified village, taking 500 prisoners. Although wounded twice more, the second time severely, Freyberg refused to leave the line until he had issued final instructions. The citation for the award, published in The London Gazette in December 1916, describes the events concluding with:

During his time on the Western Front Freyberg continued to lead by example. His bold leadership had a cost: Freyberg received nine wounds during his service in France, and men who served with him later in his career said hardly a part of his body did not have scars.

Freyberg gained promotion to the rank of temporary brigadier general (although he still had the permanent rank of only captain) and took command of the 173rd (3/1st London) Brigade, part of the 58th (2/1st London) Division, in April 1917, which reportedly made him the youngest general officer in the British Army. He was awarded a Companion of the Order of St Michael and St George the same year. In September a shell exploding at his feet inflicted the worst of his many wounds. When he resumed duty in January 1918 he again commanded 88th Brigade in the 29th Division, performing with distinction during the German spring offensives of March–April 1918. He won a bar to his DSO in September that year.

Freyberg ended the war by leading a cavalry squadron detached from 7th Dragoon Guards to seize a bridge at Lessines, which was achieved one minute before the armistice came into effect, thus earning him a second bar to the DSO. By the end of the war, Freyberg had added the French Croix de Guerre to his name, as well receiving five mentions in despatches after his escapade at Saros. With his VC and three DSOs, he ranked among the most highly decorated British Empire soldiers of the First World War.

Interbellum
Early in 1919 Freyberg was granted a Regular Army commission in the Grenadier Guards and settled into peacetime soldiering, as well as attempts to swim the English Channel. He attended the Staff College, Camberley from 1920 to 1921. From 1921 to 1925 he was a staff officer in the headquarters of the 44th (Home Counties) Division. He suffered health problems arising from his many wounds, and as part of his convalescence he visited New Zealand in 1921.

On 14 June 1922 he married Barbara McLaren (a daughter of Sir Herbert and Dame Agnes Jekyll, and the widow of the Honourable Francis McLaren) at St Martha on the Hill in Surrey. Barbara had two children from her previous marriage; she and Freyberg later had a son, Paul (1923–1993).

In the general election of 1922 he stood unsuccessfully (coming second) as a Liberal candidate for Cardiff South.

He represented New Zealand on the International Olympic Committee in 1928–30. Promoted to the permanent rank of major in 1927 (having been a substantive captain since 1916), he held a GSO2 staff appointment at Headquarters, Eastern Command until February 1929 when he was transferred to the Manchester Regiment and promoted to lieutenant-colonel and appointed to command the 1st Battalion, Manchester Regiment.

In 1931 he was promoted colonel (with seniority backdated to 1922) and was appointed Assistant Quartermaster General of Southern Command. In 1933 he wrote A Study of Unit Administration, which became a staff college textbook on quarter-masters' logistics; it went into a second edition in 1940.

In September 1933 he moved to a GSO1 posting at the War Office before being promoted major-general in July 1934. With this promotion, at age 45, he seemed headed for the highest echelons of the army. However, medical examinations prior to a posting in India revealed a heart problem. Despite strenuous efforts to surmount this, Freyberg, who was made a Companion of the Order of the Bath in 1936, was obliged to retire on 16 October 1937.

Second World War

The British Army classified Freyberg as unfit for active service in 1937. After the outbreak of war in September 1939, he returned to its active list in December as a specially employed major-general. On being approached by the New Zealand government, Freyberg offered his services and was appointed commander of the 2nd New Zealand Expeditionary Force and of the 2nd New Zealand Division.

In the chaos of the retreat from the Battle of Greece in 1941, Churchill gave Freyberg command of the Allied forces during the Battle of Crete. Although instructed to prevent an assault from the air, he remained obsessed with the possibility of a naval landing and based his tactics on it, neglecting adequately to defend the airfield at Maleme, ignoring ULTRA intelligence messages, which showed that the assault was coming by air. However, many sources consider that the intelligence given to Freyberg was vague and inadequate, and did indicate the possibility of a naval landing; this compromised his ability to respond correctly to the invasion.

Promoted to lieutenant-general, and knighted as a Knight Commander of the Order of the British Empire in the 1942 New Year Honours, Freyberg continued to command the 2nd New Zealand Division through the North African and Italian Campaigns of the Eighth Army. He had an excellent reputation as a divisional-level tactician. Winston Churchill, the British Prime Minister, described Freyberg as his "salamander" due to his love of fire and wanting to be always in the middle of the action. An exploding German shell wounded Freyberg at the Battle of Mersa Matruh in June 1942 but he soon returned to the battlefield. Freyberg disagreed strongly with his superior, General Claude Auchinleck, the Eighth Army commander and insisted that as a commander of a national contingent he had the right to refuse orders if those orders ran counter to the New Zealand national interest. Freyberg enjoyed a good relationship with General Bernard Montgomery, the Eighth Army commander from August 1942, who thought highly of the experienced New Zealand commander.

In the climactic Second Battle of El Alamein (October–November 1942) the 2nd New Zealand Division played a vital part in the breakthrough by the Eighth Army; for his leadership, Freyberg was immediately promoted to Knight Commander of the Order of the Bath. During the pursuit of the Axis forces to Tunisia, where they surrendered in May 1943, he led the New Zealanders on a series of well-executed left hooks to outflank Axis defence lines. In April and May 1943 Freyberg briefly commanded X Corps.

Freyberg was injured in an aircraft accident in September 1944. By the time of the German surrender, the New Zealanders had reached Trieste, having liberated both Padua and Venice, where there was a brief standoff with Yugoslav partisans. This success earned him a third bar to his DSO in July 1945 and he was made a Commander of the United States Legion of Merit.

Freyberg had excelled in planning set-piece attacks, such as at Operation Supercharge at Alamein, Operation Supercharge II at Tebaga Gap, and in the storming of the Senio line in 1945. The two occasions that Freyberg commanded at Corps level—at Crete and Monte Cassino—were less successful. Throughout the war he showed a disdain for danger. He showed notable concern for the welfare of his soldiers, taking a common-sense attitude to discipline and ensuring the establishment of social facilities for his men. He had become a very popular commander with the New Zealand soldiers by the time he left his command in 1945

Freyberg is closely associated with the controversial decision to bomb the ancient monastery at Monte Cassino in February 1944. Freyberg, commanding the troops which fought what later became known as the Second and Third Battles of Monte Cassino, became convinced the abbey, founded in 529 AD, was being used as a military stronghold. The analysis of one of Freyberg's divisional commanders, Major-General Francis Tuker of the 4th Indian Infantry Division, concluded in a memo to Freyberg that, regardless of whether the monastery was occupied by the Germans, it should be demolished to prevent its occupation. General Sir Harold Alexander, commander of the 15th Army Group (later the Allied Armies in Italy), agreed to the bombing (which did not employ blockbuster bombs). After the monastery's destruction, the ruins were occupied by German forces, which held the position until 18 May. Following the war, the abbot of the monastery and other monks said that German troops had not occupied the inside of the abbey and it was not being used for military purposes.

Post-war

Freyberg relinquished command of the New Zealand division, on 22 November 1945 having accepted an invitation to become Governor-General of New Zealand – the first with a New Zealand upbringing. He left London for his new post on 3 May 1946, after being made a Knight Grand Cross of the Order of St Michael and St George. He retired from the army on 10 September 1946.

Freyberg served as Governor-General of New Zealand from 1946 until 1952. In this post he played a very active role, visiting all parts of New Zealand and its dependencies.

On  Freyberg was appointed a Knight of the Order of Saint John; his wife, Barbara, was made a Dame of the order at the same time.

King George VI raised Freyberg to the peerage as Baron Freyberg of Wellington in New Zealand and of Munstead in the County of Surrey in 1951.

After his term as New Zealand Governor-General had finished, Freyberg returned to England, where he sat frequently in the House of Lords. On 1 March 1953 he became the Deputy Constable and Lieutenant-Governor of Windsor Castle; he took up residence in the Norman Gateway the following year.

Freyberg died at Windsor on 4 July 1963 following the rupture of one of his war wounds, and was buried in the churchyard of St Martha on the Hill near Guildford, Surrey. His wife is buried at his side, and their son, who had been awarded the Military Cross, at the end of their graves.

Tributes

An athlete as well as a soldier, he is memorialised in the name of the Ministry of Defence's headquarters, a stadium in Auckland and Wellington's swimming pool on the site of his early victories. A number of streets are named after him including Freyberg Place in front of the Metropolis tower in central Auckland where there is a statue of him.

Auckland's Freyberg Place (also known as Freyberg Square) was opened in 1946; Wellington's Freyberg Pool in Oriental Bay opened in 1963; and Auckland's Freyberg Field opened in 1965. The 15-story Freyberg Building in Aitken Street, Thorndon, Wellington, was built in 1979. The adjacent Freyberg House built in about 2007 was demolished in 2018 after being damaged by the 2016 Kaikoura earthquake. Freyberg High School in Palmerston North opened in 1955.

The Sir Bernard Freyberg Cup is awarded to the winner in single sculls at the New Zealand Rowing Championship.

In November 2016 a blue plaque was unveiled at 8 Dynevor Road, Richmond, where he was born and a VC commemorative paving stone was unveiled to him outside Richmond Station by the Mayor of Richmond and the present Lord Freyberg.

Styles
Note: An asterisk (*) denotes a Bar to the DSO.
 1889–1914: Bernard Cyril Freyberg
 1914 – 3 June 1915: Commander (temp.) Bernard Cyril Freyberg, RNVR
 3 June 1915 – May 1916: Commander (temp.) Bernard Cyril Freyberg, DSO, RNVR
 May–June 1916: Captain Bernard Cyril Freyberg, DSO
 June–July 1916: Captain (Temp. Major) Bernard Cyril Freyberg, DSO
 July – 12 December 1916: Captain (Temp. Lieutenant-Colonel) Bernard Cyril Freyberg, DSO
 12 December 1916 – 1917: Captain (Temp. Lieutenant-Colonel) Bernard Cyril Freyberg, VC, DSO
 1917 – 1 February 1919: Captain (Temp. Brigadier-General) Bernard Cyril Freyberg, VC, DSO
 1 February – 7 March 1919: Captain (Brevet Lieutenant-Colonel; Temp. Brigadier) Bernard Cyril Freyberg, VC, DSO*
 7 March – June 1919: Captain (Brevet Lieutenant-Colonel) Bernard Cyril Freyberg, VC, DSO*
 June 1919 – 1920: Captain (Brevet Lieutenant-Colonel) Bernard Cyril Freyberg, VC, DSO**
 1920–1927: Captain (Brevet Lieutenant-Colonel) Bernard Cyril Freyberg, VC, CMG, DSO**
 1927–1929: Major (Brevet Lieutenant-Colonel) Bernard Cyril Freyberg, VC, CMG, DSO**
 1929–1931: Lieutenant-Colonel Bernard Cyril Freyberg, VC, CMG, DSO**
 1931–1934: Colonel Bernard Cyril Freyberg, VC, CMG, DSO**
 1934–1935: Major-General Bernard Cyril Freyberg, VC, CMG, DSO**
 1935–1941: Major-General Bernard Cyril Freyberg, VC, CB, CMG, DSO**
 1941–1942: Lieutenant-General Sir Bernard Cyril Freyberg, VC, KBE, CB, CMG, DSO**
 1942–1945: Lieutenant-General Sir Bernard Cyril Freyberg, VC, KCB, KBE, CMG, DSO**
 1945–1946: Lieutenant-General Sir Bernard Cyril Freyberg, VC, KCB, KBE, CMG, DSO***
 1946–1951: Lieutenant-General His Excellency Sir Bernard Cyril Freyberg, VC, GCMG, KCB, KBE, DSO***
 1951–1952: Lieutenant-General His Excellency The Right Honourable The Lord Freyberg, VC, GCMG, KCB, KBE, DSO***
 1952–1963: Lieutenant-General The Right Honourable The Lord Freyberg, VC, GCMG, KCB, KBE, DSO***

Arms

Notes

References

External links

 NZ Official Governor General biography.  Accessed 20 August 2020.
 First World War.com – Who's Who – Bernard Freyberg. Accessed 14 February 2006.
  from the Dictionary of New Zealand Biography
  . Accessed 14 February 2006.
 Location of grave and VC medal (Surrey). Accessed 14 February 2006.
 Photo of Generals Freyberg and Morshead conferring in a shell hole in North Africa
 New Zealand Army Officers 1939–1945
 
 
 
Generals of World War II

|-

|-

1889 births
1963 deaths
British Army lieutenant generals
Battle of the Somme recipients of the Victoria Cross
British Army generals of World War I
British Army generals of World War II
Queen's Royal Regiment officers
Grenadier Guards officers
Manchester Regiment officers
Crete in World War II
People educated at Wellington College (New Zealand)
Governors-General of New Zealand
International Olympic Committee members
Recipients of the Croix de Guerre 1914–1918 (France)
Commanders of the Legion of Merit
Grand Commanders of the Order of George I with Swords
Knights Commander of the Order of the British Empire
Knights Commander of the Order of the Bath
Knights Grand Cross of the Order of St Michael and St George
Recipients of the War Cross (Greece)
Recipients of the Cross of Valour (Greece)
New Zealand generals
New Zealand military personnel of World War II
New Zealand sports executives and administrators
New Zealand World War I recipients of the Victoria Cross
New Zealand people of English descent
New Zealand people of Austrian descent
British emigrants to New Zealand
People from Richmond, London
Royal Navy officers of World War I
New Zealand commanders
British Army recipients of the Victoria Cross
Companions of the Distinguished Service Order
Liberal Party (UK) hereditary peers
Graduates of the Staff College, Camberley
Barons created by George VI
Burials in Surrey
Military personnel from Surrey